Nikolai Aleksandrovich Stasenko (born 15 February 1987) is a Belarusian professional ice hockey defenceman. He is currently an unrestricted free agent who most recently played for Avtomobilist Yekaterinburg of the Kontinental Hockey League (KHL).

Stasenko played for Belarus at the 2010 Winter Olympics. He has also participated in several World Championships.

Career statistics

Regular season and playoffs

International

References

External links

1987 births
Living people
Amur Khabarovsk players
Avtomobilist Yekaterinburg players
Belarusian ice hockey defencemen
Expatriate ice hockey players in Russia
Ice hockey players at the 2010 Winter Olympics
Olympic ice hockey players of Belarus
People from Primorsky Krai
Severstal Cherepovets players
HC Vityaz players
Yunost Minsk players
Sportspeople from Primorsky Krai